Lawrence Stanley Ritter (May 23, 1922 – February 15, 2004) was an American writer whose specialties were economics and baseball.

Ritter was a professor of economics and finance, and chairman of the Department of Finance at the Graduate School of Business Administration of New York University. He also edited The Journal of Finance from 1964 to 1966. In 1970, Ritter served as president of the American Finance Association. He died at age 81 in New York City. His book, Principles of Money, Banking, and Financial Markets, coauthored with William L. Silber and Gregory F. Udell, has gone through twelve editions and has been a standard college text since it was first published in 1974.

Ritter is best known for writing one of the most famous sports books of all time, The Glory of Their Times (1966, updated 1984).  He collaborated with another baseball historian, Donald Honig, on The Image of Their Greatness (1979) and The 100 Greatest Baseball Players of All Time (1981, featuring several players who would later be dropped in favor of new players on several later all-time greats lists).

In researching The Glory of Their Times, Ritter travelled 75,000 miles to interview his subjects, sitting for hours listening to them tell their tales into his tape recorder. Ritter's "Existential" style of interviewing was to allow his subjects to reminisce freely, rarely prodding or probing them on anything. No questions about specific games. No questions about what it was like to face certain players. Ritter's technique was to get his interviewee comfortable around him, to turn the tape-recorder on, and shut up while his subjects spoke. Ritter's style elicited responses that other reporters never reach with questions.  His most difficult "find" was Sam Crawford, who shared the outfield with Ty Cobb in Detroit. After being given only cryptic hints about where he might find Crawford, i.e., "drive between 175 and 225 miles north of Los Angeles", Crawford's wife told Ritter, "and you'll be warm" – Ritter ended up in Baywood Park, California where his inquiries yielded nothing. After several days, he sat in a laundromat watching his clothes spin beside an old man. Ritter asked him if he knew anything about Sam Crawford, the old ball player. The man replied, "Well I should hope so. Bein' as I'm him."

Books
 The Glory of Their Times: The Story of the Early Days of Baseball Told by the Men who Played it, Published by Harpercollins 1992, 384 pages
 The 100 Greatest Baseball Players of All Time, Published by Crown Publishers 1981, 273 pages
 Lost Ballparks: A Celebration of Baseball's Legendary Fields, Published by Penguin Group 1992, 210 pages
 The image of their greatness: an illustrated history of baseball from 1900 to the present, Published by Crown Trade Paperbacks 1992, 438 pages
 Money and economic activity: readings in money and banking, Published by Houghton Mifflin 1961, 457 pages
 East Side, West Side: Tales of New York Sporting Life, 1910–1960, Published by Total Sports Publishing, 1998, 210 pages. Foreword by Lawrence Block.
Leagues Apart: The Men and Times of the Negro Baseball Leagues by Lawrence S. Ritter,  January 1999  HarperCollins Publishers

References

External links
The Glory of Their Times photographs
Lawrence Ritter - Baseball Biography
Boston Globe obituary
Marty Appel writeup
List of Ritter Audio Tapes
Lou Parrotta critique on Glory of Their Times
New York Times obituary
New York Times George Vecsey column on Lawrence Ritter's passing
Interview with baseball historian Larry Ritter (1975) conducted by Eugene C. Murdock at the Digital Gallery of Cleveland Public Library. According to the site: "Comments by Dr. and Mrs. Murdock on interview with Lawrence S. Ritter on April 18, 1975, about how he accomplished his oral history interviews for his book The Glory of Their Times (31 min., 1 sec.)."

1922 births
2004 deaths
American sportswriters
20th-century American economists
Baseball writers
University of Wisconsin–Madison alumni
The Journal of Finance editors
Presidents of the American Finance Association
New York University faculty